George Arnold (June 24, 1834 – November 9, 1865) was an American author and poet. 

He was born in New York City on June 24, 1834. After briefly attempting a career as a portrait painter, he turned to writing and became a regular contributor to Vanity Fair and The Leader. A contemporary of Walt Whitman, Arnold was likewise a patron of Pfaff's beer cellar.

His most enduring work is a humorous piece, The Jolly Old Pedagogue.

He died on November 9, 1865, in Monmouth County, New Jersey.

External links

 
 
 

1834 births
1865 deaths
Poets from New York (state)
Writers from New York City
19th-century American poets
American male poets
19th-century American male writers